Alexander Richardson (c1565-1613?) was an English logician.

Life 
Richardson was a Master of Arts at Queens' College, Cambridge.  He also tutored at George Walker's house in Barking, Essex.

Works 
Richardson wrote a logic textbook in the Ramist tradition, The logicians school-master: or, A comment upon Ramus logick.: By Mr. Alexander Richardson, sometime of Queenes Colledge in Cambridge. Whereunto are added, his prelections on Ramus his grammer; Taleus his rhetorick; also his notes on physicks, ethicks, astronomy, medicine, and opticks.  The book was first published in London in 1629 and enlarged in 1657.

References 

1565 births
1613 deaths